Ironi Nahariya Basketball Club known for sponsorship reasons as Ironi Rain Nahariya is a professional basketball club based in city of Nahariya in northern Israel. The team plays in the Liga Leumit (the second tier of Israeli basketball) and internationally in the Balkan International Basketball League. The team currently plays in the Ein Sara Sport Hall, which is home to 2,500 spectators.

History

1970s-1990s

Ironi Nahariya was founded originally as Hapoel Nahariya in 1970. The club originally supported orange and blue as its main colors. From 1970–1992, the club played in the lower leagues of Israeli Basketball. The 1991–92 National League season saw Hapoel Nahariya achieve promotion to the Premier League for the first time in club history. Their stay was short-lived as the club was relegated at the end of the 1993–94 season. The club would end up getting relegated again to the third tier at the end of the 1995–96 season.

2000s

Hapoel Nahariya would achieve promotion back to the National League at the end of the 1999–2000 season. The 2000–01 season was Hapoel Nahariya first season back in the National League, the club finished fourth in the league table, however, they failed to achieve promotion. Nahariya would achieve promotion to the Premier League in the 2001–02 National League season, as the team finished second place in the league table. 

The 2002–03 season would be Hapoel Nahariya first season back in the Premier League since 1994. The season would mark the team colors to change from the original orange and blue to purple and white. Nahariya would go on to have a successful campaign as the club finished second place in the Premier League. Nahariya managed to make it all the way to the Premier League final before losing to eventual champions Maccabi Tel Aviv.

The 2003–04 season would mark Hapoel Nahariya first time in international competition as the club qualified for the 2003–04 FIBA Europe League. In the qualifying round, Nahariya finished second place and advanced in the playoffs where they met and defeated Turkish side Türk Telekom in a best out of two series in the Round of 16 before eventually falling to Russian side Ural Great in the quarterfinals. Domestically, Nahariya would continue their success from last season as they would finish third place in the league table as they would reach the semifinals before losing to Hapoel Tel Aviv.

Hapoel Nahariya third place finish allowed them to qualify for the 2004–05 FIBA Europe League where they finished top of their group. Nahariya would defeat Dutch side Demon Astronauts in the Round of 16 before yet again getting eliminated in the Round of 16, this time against Ukrainian side Kyiv. Nahariya would finish their 2004–05 Premier League campaign in sixth place as they would be eliminated in the quarterfinals against Ironi Ashkelon. Nahariya managed to make the semifinals of the State Cup before eventually getting eliminated against Bnei Hasharon.

Hapoel Nahariya were unable to replicate their success in international competition as the 2005–06 FIBA EuroCup would see Nahariya finish third in their group, they were unable to finish above Russian side Khimki and Czech side ČEZ Nymburk and thus were eliminated. Nahariya were able to finish in fourth place in the league table as they would lose in the semifinals to eventual champions Maccabi Tel Aviv.

Hapoel Nahariya would continue to struggle in international competition as yet again they would finish third in their group in the 2006–07 FIBA EuroCup just behind Spanish side MMT Estudiantes and French side JDA Dijon. Nahariya would finish fifth place in the league, however, they would be just short of a playoff spot and ultimately missed out on the playoffs.

The 2007–08 campaign would see the team undergo a name change as they would become known as Iscar Nahariya. Nahariya would disappoint in the 2007–08 FIBA EuroCup, as the club would be eliminated in the second preliminary round by Latvian side Barons LMT. This would be Nahariya's last time in international competition until 2016. Nahariya would finish fourth in the league and would be eliminated in the semifinals against eventual champions Hapoel Holon. The season would mark the beginning of the end for Nahariya.

The club would undergo yet another name change as they would be renamed to from Iscar Nahariya to Ironi Nahariya. The team would struggle in the 2008–09 Premier League as they would have a disappointing seventh place finish.

Ironi Nahariya would have one of their worst seasons in recent memory as the club would finish ninth place in the 2009–10 Premier League. The ninth place finish meant that the team qualified for the playout in order to stay in the Premier League, however, they would lose the series against Hapoel Holon and thus were relegated to the National League for the first time since 2002.

2010s

Ironi Nahariya would spend the next four seasons in the National League. The club would struggle in the 2010–11 and 2011–12 campaign as they would finish both fourteenth and tenths respectively. Nahariya would see much better success in 2012–13 as they would finish second, however, they were unable to get promoted. The 2013–14 season would see them finish first place in the National League and achieve promotion to the Premier League.

The 2014–15 Premier League season would prove to be rough for Nahariya as the team would finish tenth in their first time in the top-flight since 2010. The team was able to avoid relegation and thus would stay for another season.

In their second season back in the Premier League, the 2015–16 would show glimpses of the club's past in the mid-2000s, as the team would finish fourth in the league and qualify for the playoffs for the first time since 2009. The excitement was short lived, however, as the club would be upset in the quarterfinals against fifth seed [[Hapoel Eilat B.C.
|Hapoel Eilat]], which included a one-point loss at home against Eilat which would lead to their elimination.

For the first time since 2008, Ironi Nahariya would qualify for international competition in the form of the 2016–17 Basketball Champions League, the club was drawn into the second qualifying round where they would defeat Belarusian side Tsmoki Minsk and qualify for the Regular Season. Nahariya would end up finishing sixth in their group and were unable to qualify for the playoffs, however, they would be transferred to the playoffs of the FIBA Europe Cup where Nahariya would make it to the quarterfinals before being eliminated by German side Telekom Baskets Bonn. The team finished sixth place in the Premier League and were able to qualify for the playoffs where they would be eliminated against eventual champions Hapoel Jerusalem. 

The 2017–18 season would be the start of another decline for the team as they would finish ninth in the league. The team was unable to qualify for the playoffs ultimately due to losing the tie-breaker against Ironi Nes Ziona.

The team would have a disappointing 2018–19 Premier League campaign as Nahariya would finish eleventh place in the league table. The team would just narrowly avoid relegation by two games.

The trend would keep continuing as Nahariya finished yet again eleventh place in the 2019–20 Premier League season. Originally, the team was seventh place after twenty-two matchdays, however, the COVID-19 pandemic led to the brief suspension of the 2019–20 Premier League season.  Once league play returned, the club was unable to gain their form back. There was some success this season, as Nahariya would make it to the finals of the State Cup for the first time in club history before losing to Hapoel Jerusalem.

2020s

The 2020–21 season would prove to be disastrous for the club. The season marked the club's return to international competition since 2017 when the club and the eleven other Israeli  clubs (excluding Maccabi Tel Aviv) joined the competition, after temporary suspension of 2020-2021 Israeli Basketball League due to the COVID-19 pandemic. The club was drawn into Group B alongside Hapoel Gilboa Galil and Maccabi Haifa. The team defeated Maccabi Haifa in both meetings, however, they lost both meetings between Hapoel Gilboa Galil. The club finished with two wins and placed second, however, they did not advance to the second round and thus ended their international campaign. The Israeli League campaign wouldn’t go any better as the club would finish with a league worst three wins and twenty-seven losses record and ultimately relegation to the National League.

Honours

Domestic competitions
State Cup
Runners-up: 2020

Lower division competitions
Liga Artzit / Israeli National League 
Winners: 1981 , 2014

National League Cup
Champions (1): 2022

European competitions

Regional competitions
Balkan League
Final-Four: 2022

Sponsorship naming

Due to sponsorship deals, Ironi Nahariya have been also known as:
Ironi Isscar Nahariya (2007–2008)
Ironi Geshem Nahariya (2020–2021)
Ironi Rain Nahariya (2021–present)

Players

Current roster

Depth chart

Squad changes for the 2021–22 season

In

      
      
   
 
 
 
    

|}

Out

 

|}

Season by season

Head coaches
 Roy Hagay (2014)
 Eric Alfasi (2015–2019)
 Danny Franco (2020)
 Shay Seglovich (2021–present)

Notable players

References

External links
Official website 
 Fans site 

1970 establishments in Israel
Basketball teams in Israel
Israeli Basketball Premier League teams
Basketball teams established in 1970